Guillermo Battaglia (December 7, 1899September 26, 1988) was a prolific Argentine film actor of the classic era of Argentine cinema.

Born in Buenos Aires, he began his film career in 1937 in Melodías porteñas. Battaglia starred in over 100 films between then and 1987. He was one of the most prolific supporting actors during this entire period, notably in Roberto Cossa's La nona (1979), David Lipszyc's Volver (1982), Alberto Fischerman's Los días de junio (1985), and the Best foreign film oscar-winning The Official Story in 1985.

He died of a heart attack in September 1988.

Personal life
He was married to Argentine actress Nora Cullen.

Selected filmography

Melodías porteñas (1937)
Villa Discordia (1938)
La Novia de los forasteros (1942)
Locos de verano (1942)
Todo un hombre (1943)
Safo, historia de una pasión (1943) .... Caudal
His Best Student (1944)
El Muerto falta à la cita (1944) .... Doctor Emilio Quiroga
Se abre el abismo (1945)
Las seis suegras de Barba Azul (1945)
Stella (1945)
Viaje sin regreso (1946)
Camino del infierno (1946) .... Dr.Mas
The Lady of Death (1946) .... Hugo Clinton
The Maharaja's Diamond (1946)
The Naked Angel (1946) .... Guillermo Lagos Renard
Encrucijada (1947)
Los Verdes paraísos (1947)
El que recibe las bofetadas (1947)
La Muerte camina en la lluvia (1948) .... Boris Andreieff
Con el diablo en el cuerpo (1947)
Como tú lo soñaste (1947)
La Dama del collar (1948)
A Story of the Nineties (1949) .... 'Pardo' Márquez
Yo no elegí mi vida (1949)
Las Aventuras de Jack (1949)
El Hijo de la calle (1949)
Filomena Marturano (1950)
¿Vendrás a media noche? (1950)
la Fuerza ciega (1950)
El Regreso (1950) .... Diablo
Mi vida por la tuya (1951) .... Francisco Aguirre
Tierra extraña (1951)
The Unwanted (1951)
La Bestia debe morir (1952) .... Jorge Rattery
Deshonra (1952) .... Prison Inspector
Un Guapo del 900 (1952)
Acorralada (1953)
Los Troperos (1953)
Los Tres mosquiteros (1953)
Caídos en el infierno (1954)
Siete gritos en el mar (1954)
Mi viudo y yo (1954)
Vida nocturna (1955)
Los Hampones (1955)
La Novia (1955)
Codicia (1955)
Bendita seas (1956) .... Francisco Arguello
Section des disparus (1956) .... Le commissaire de police
El Protegido (1956) .... Vañasco
Después del silencio (1956)
La Casa del ángel (1957) .... Dr. Castro, Father of Ana
La Bestia humana (1957)
Dagli Appennini alle Ande (1959)
The Candidate (1959)
Angustia de un secreto (1959)
Los Acusados (1960)
Yo quiero vivir contigo (1960)
La Potranca (1960)
Don Frutos Gómez (1961)
The Romance of a Gaucho (1961)
Buscando a Mónica (1962) .... Padre de Mónica
La Cigarra no es un bicho (1964) .... Doctor
Pesadilla (1963)
Viaje al más allá, Un (1964)
Los evadidos (1964)
El Gordo Villanueva (1964)
Proceso à la conciencia (1964)
El Club del clan (1964)
Los Hipócritas (1965)
Ritmo nuevo y vieja ola (1965) .... Quiroga
Mi primera novia (1965) .... Don Faustino
Canuto Cañete, detective privado (1965) .... Carranza
Hotel alojamiento (1966)
Fuego en la sangre (1966)
Una Máscara para Ana (1966)
I Need a Mother (1966)
El Hombre invisible ataca (1967) .... Police Chief
Patapufete! (1967) .... Wise Russian
Asalto a la ciudad (1968)
Story of a Poor Young Man (1968) .... Santiago Quijano
El Novicio rebelde (1968) .... Ricardo Fernandez
Deliciosamente amoral (1969)
Los muchachos de antes no usaban gomina (1969)
El Día que me quieras (1969) .... Don Ramon Quiroga
Amalio Reyes, un hombre (1970)
Joven, viuda y estanciera (1970)
Intimidades de una cualquiera (1972) .... Antonio
Destino de un capricho (1972)
Hipólito y Evita (1973)
La Mary (1974) .... Doctor
La Nona (1979)
Los Viernes de la eternidad (1981) .... Don Tobías Abud
La Conquista del paraíso (1981) .... The father
Volver (1982)
La Espera (1983, Short)
Noches sin lunas ni soles (1984) .... Sr. Bertozzi
La Historia oficial (1985) .... Jose
Los Días de junio (1985)
Miss Mary (1986) .... Grandfather
Sentimientos: Mirta de Liniers a Estambul (1987) .... (final film role)

References

External links
 

1899 births
1988 deaths
Argentine male film actors
20th-century Argentine male actors
Male actors from Buenos Aires
Burials at La Chacarita Cemetery